The Hotel Aldridge in Wewoka, Oklahoma is a brick building that was built in 1927, four years after the Wewoka Pool of the Seminole Oil Field was opened.  It was listed on the National Register of Historic Places in 1986.

It was deemed significant as the oldest oil boom era hotel in Wewoka and as the best surviving example of Plains Commercial architecture in Wewoka.

See also
Aldridge Hotel (disambiguation)

References

Hotel buildings on the National Register of Historic Places in Oklahoma
Hotel Aldridge
Hotels established in 1927
Hotel buildings completed in 1927
Hotel Aldridge